The 1978 Fairfield Bay Classic, also known as the Arkansas International, was a men's tennis tournament played on indoor hardcourts at Burns Park in North Little Rock, Arkansas in the United States that was part of the 1978 Grand Prix circuit. It was the fifth edition of the event and was held from January 30 through February 5, 1978. First-seeded Dick Stockton won the singles title and earned $10,000 first-prize money.

Finals

Singles
 Dick Stockton  defeated   Hank Pfister 6–4, 3–5, retired
 It was Stockton's 1st singles title of the year and the 8th and last of his career.

Doubles
 Colin Dibley /  Geoff Masters defeated  Tim Gullikson /  Tom Gullikson 7–6, 6–3

References

External links
 ITF tournament edition details

Arkansas International
Arkansas International
Arkansas International